Admaston is a village in the English ceremonial county of Shropshire, in the borough of Telford & Wrekin. It is located northwest of Wellington and close to the village of Wrockwardine. It now forms part of the Telford new town.

History 
The village of Admaston dates to before the time of the Domesday Book, which records the area as being held by Almund and his son Alward, from the Earl of Shrewsbury. The village name derives from Saxon "Eadmund's Tun", translating to "Eadmund's Homestead". 

Admaston achieved some level of fame in the 18th century when its natural saline spring was developed into a small spa. The spa building opened in 1750 and had established a hotel by 1805. By this time the waters of Admaston Spa were revered for their restorative qualities but the spa's popularity began to decline from the 1860s and it became a private home. The imposing main building with its distinctive clock house was used as the headquarters of the Admaston Home Guard during the Second World War, after which it was restored and is now once again a private residence. 

Until the 1960s the village was surrounded by predominantly farmland; following the formation of Telford new town much of this land was built on to significantly expand the residential development in the area.

Services 
Admaston has a row of shops, including a hairdresser, Post Office, and two small convenience stores. It also has one public house, The Pheasant, a Methodist church and a Newfrontiers church called Hope Admaston. St Peter's Church at Wrockwardine is Admaston's Church of England parish church.

Local recreational services include two football pitches and a bike park, whilst the new addition of a football and basketball games area has been popular with the local young people. A local community centre, Admaston House, run by local charity St Christopher's Trust Admaston, has several weekly clubs and activities. St Christopher's Trust also organise a week of community events at the end of June called Admaston Fun Week. A holiday club for primary school children runs in the morning and events for families and young people in the evening.

Notable people 
Former TT road racer William (Bill) Doran lived in Station Road, Admaston, at time of his death in 1973.

Donald Fear, winner of game show Who Wants to be a Millionaire? in 2020, is a resident of Admaston.

See also
Listed buildings in Wrockwardine

References

External links

 
 
 
 

Villages in Shropshire